The Dynamic Albedo of Neutrons (DAN) instrument is an experiment mounted on the Mars Science Laboratory Curiosity rover. It is a pulsed sealed-tube neutron source and detector used to measure hydrogen or ice and water at or near the Martian surface.  The instrument consists of the detector element (DE) and a 14.1 MeV pulsing neutron generator (PNG). The die-away time of neutrons is measured by the DE after each neutron pulse from the PNG.
DAN was provided by the Russian Federal Space Agency, funded by Russia and is under the leadership of Principal Investigator Igor Mitrofanov.

History
On August 18, 2012 (sol ), DAN was turned on, marking the success of a Russian-American collaboration on the surface of Mars and the first working Russian science instrument on the Martian surface since Mars 3 stopped transmitting over forty years ago. The instrument is designed to detect subsurface water.

On March 18, 2013 (sol ), NASA reported evidence of mineral hydration, likely hydrated calcium sulfate, in several rock samples including the broken fragments of "Tintina" rock and "Sutton Inlier" rock as well as in veins and nodules in other rocks like "Knorr" rock and "Wernicke" rock.

On August 19, 2015, NASA scientists reported that the DAN instrument on Curiosity detected an unusual hydrogen-rich area, at "Marias Pass," on Mars. The hydrogen found seemed related to water or hydroxyl ions in rocks within three feet beneath the rover, according to the scientists.

See also
Exploration of Mars
Groundwater on Mars
Timeline of Mars Science Laboratory
Water on Mars

References

External links
 

Mars Science Laboratory instruments
Space program of Russia
Space science experiments
Spacecraft instruments